Ephysteris aulacopis is a moth in the family Gelechiidae. It was described by Edward Meyrick in 1923. It is found in Nepal and Assam, India.

The wingspan is 10–11 mm. The forewings are pale grey speckled with dark fuscous, suffusedly streaked with ochreous brown between the veins, and with a few black specks posteriorly. The stigmata are black, the plical obliquely before the first discal. The hindwings are grey.

References

Ephysteris
Moths described in 1923